Shuitou   is a town (a township-level division) of Nan'an City, in southern Fujian province, China.

Shuitou is located on the western side of the Shijing River and its estuary, the Anhai Bay. It is connected to its eastern neighbor, the town of Anhai, by the famous ancient five-li-long Anping Bridge, built from large (some almost 10 meters long) slabs of stone. There is also a modern road to Anhai (and on to Jinjiang City and Quanzhou), which has a much shorter bridge over the Shijing, as the estuary has largely silted up over a thousand of years since the old bridge was built.

Economy

Shuitou, similarly to its southern neighbor, Shijing, has a significant stone-working industry.

There is a fair amount of new economic development in town, some of it connected to the trade with Taiwan.

Aquaculture is practiced on the Anhai Bay (the estuary of the Shijing River). As of ca. 2001, 138.5 hectares of the bay's mudflats and water surface were used for aquaculture; this included 37.5 ha used for raising the blood cockles (Tegillarca granosa, 泥蚶), 58.3 ha used for the Chinese razor clam (Sinonovacula constricta, 缢蛏), 16.2 ha used for oyster farming, and 26.5 ha used for shrimp farming.
Over 1400 people from Shuitou's Gangnei Village were employed in aquaculture and fishing.

See also

List of township-level divisions of Fujian

References

Township-level divisions of Fujian